Never the Twain is a British television sitcom created by Johnnie Mortimer. The show debuted on 7 September 1981 on ITV. During its ten-year run, 11 series and a Christmas special were produced, with 67 episodes broadcast in total. The lead characters are Simon Peel and Oliver Smallbridge, played by Donald Sinden and Windsor Davies respectively, who are rival antique dealers that have shops next door to each other as well as neighbouring houses. Peel's son David (Robin Kermode/Christopher Morris) and Smallbridge's daughter Lynn (Julia Watson/Tacy Kneale) enter into a relationship and marry much to the reluctance of their fathers. Peel and Smallbridge engage in a continuous games of one-upmanship but often appear to be friends despite neither prepared to admit it. Recurring characters include Veronica Barton (Honor Blackman), a middle-class widow whom Peel and Smallbridge battle for the affection of; Banks (Teddy Turner), Peel's butler; Ringo (Derek Deadman), Smallbridge's idiotic shop assistant; Mrs. Sadler (Maria Charles), Smallbridge's clumsy cleaner who has a habit of breaking things; and Eleanor (Zara Nutley), Peel's auntie.

Series overview

Episodes

Series 1 (1981)

Series 2 (1982)

Series 3 (1983)

Series 4 (1984)

Series 5 (1986)

Series 6 (1987)

Series 7 (1988)

Series 8 (1988)

Series 9 (1989)

Christmas Special (1989)

Series 10 (1990)

Series 11 (1991)

References

External links
 
 

Lists of British sitcom episodes
ITV-related lists